Antenor Junior Fernandes da Silva Vitoria (born 10 April 1988), known as Junior Fernandes, is a Chilean professional footballer who plays for Turkish club Manisa as a forward.

Club career

Cobreloa
The son of Brazilian parents, Fernandes moved from his native Tocopilla to Calama at the age of six, where he attended school along with his brother Christian. There, they participated in sports and music. While he lived in Calama, he joined the lower divisions of Cobreloa, participating in each of their youth categories and was integrated to Cobreloa's B team that participated in the Chilean Third Division during the 2006 season. In this period of time, he shared team and home with countryman forward Alexis Sánchez.

Later, in 2007, he was sent on loan to Mejillones (another third division team) after Cobreloa gave up their reserve team.

After the request of coach Lewis Sheldon, Fernandes joined Cobreloa's first team to face the Clausura tournament . His professional debut came in the fourth round of the championship, when he replaced striker Felipe Flores in a match that would end with a 2–1 victory over La Serena. His first time as a starter was in a game against Melipilla, which ended in a 5–1 victory, with Fernandes scoring a hat trick.

Palestino
In 2010, he played for Magallanes of the Chilean Tercera División A where he became the figure of the team that won the championship and was promoted to the Primera B. His outstanding performance on Magallanes caught the attention of Palestino, joining them in 2011, and thanks to his good results, he later was nominated for the Under 25 Chile national football team.

Universidad de Chile
On 2 December 2011, Palestino agreed on the sale of 50% of his pass with a US$700,000 transfer to Universidad de Chile aiming to win the 2012 Apertura tournament, and thinking that the team will play Copa Libertadores next year. On 5 December, he was presented in the offices of "the Blues" Sports Complex with the No. 9 jersey. Fernandes made his debut for the club, scoring and providing an assist in a 3–1 win over Deportes La Serena on 4 February 2012. In the league, he would score five goals. In the play-offs Apertura, Fernándes scored a hat-trick in a 4–0 win over Colo-Colo on 24 June 2012. Elsewhere in the Copa Libertadores, Fernandes scored a hat-trick and set up a goal in a 5–1 win over Godoy Cruz and soon scored a brace and providing an assist in a 6–0 win over Deportivo Quito. Soon after scoring goals, he would receive criticism over his performance.

Bayer Leverkusen
On 6 July 2012, he signed for Bundesliga squad Bayer 04 Leverkusen from Universidad de Chile for a transfer fee of €7 million and a five-year contract. Fernandes made his debut for the club, scoring on his debut in first round of DFB-Pokal in a 4–0 win over Carl Zeiss Jena; seven days later, he made his debut, coming on as a substitute, in a 2–1 loss against Frankfurt. However, in his first season, Junior Fernandes playing time was reduced, as well his first team and haven't scored his first goal for the club.

Dinamo Zagreb
On 26 May 2013, it was announced that Fernandes signed a one-year-loan contract with the Croatian club Dinamo Zagreb. On 23 April 2014, following the end of his loan spell, Fernandes signed a six-year contract with Dinamo Zagreb.

Alanyaspor
In January 2017 he was loaned to Alanyaspor until the end of the 2016–17 season. He returned to Dinamo for the 2017–18 season  and scored twice against defending league champion Rijeka. However, as Dinamo failed to qualify into Europa League, losing to Skënderbeu Korçë in the play-off round, he moved back to Alanyaspor on a permanent transfer.

Ittihad Kalba
On 19 August 2020, Fernandes joined Ittihad Kalba of the UAE Pro League.

İstanbul Başakşehir
On 23 January 2021, Fernandes agreed to a return to Turkey and joined İstanbul Başakşehir on a free transfer.

Manisa FK
On 16 January 2023, Fernandes agreed to a return to Turkey and joined Manisa in the TFF First League on a free transfer.

International career
Fernandes was called up to the Chile national football team to face friendly matches during the second half of 2011 by team manager Claudio Borghi. He debuted officially in the national team on 11 September 2012, on a qualifying match for the 2014 FIFA World Cup against Colombia.

He was named in the preliminary squad for the 2015 Copa América but was omitted from the final squad. He finally made the final squad for the 2019 Copa América, his first major tournament.

Honours

Club
Magallanes
Tercera División de Chile: 2010

Universidad de Chile
Primera División de Chile: 2012 Apertura

Dinamo Zagreb
Croatian First League: 2013–14, 2014–15, 2015–16, 2017–18
Croatian Cup: 2014–15, 2015–16
Croatian Super Cup: 2013

International
Chile
China Cup: 2017

References

External links
 
 Junior Fernandes at Football-Lineups
 
 

1988 births
Living people
People from Tocopilla
Chilean people of Brazilian descent
Chilean footballers
Chile international footballers
Chilean Primera División players
Cobreloa footballers
Club Deportivo Palestino footballers
Universidad de Chile footballers
Tercera División de Chile players
Municipal Mejillones footballers
Magallanes footballers
Deportes Magallanes footballers
Bundesliga players
Bayer 04 Leverkusen players
Croatian Football League players
GNK Dinamo Zagreb players
Süper Lig players
Alanyaspor footballers
İstanbul Başakşehir F.K. players
UAE Pro League players
Al-Ittihad Kalba SC players
TFF First League players
Association football forwards
Chilean expatriate footballers
Chilean expatriate sportspeople in Germany
Chilean expatriate sportspeople in Croatia
Chilean expatriate sportspeople in Turkey
Chilean expatriate sportspeople in the United Arab Emirates
Expatriate footballers in Germany
Expatriate footballers in Croatia
Expatriate footballers in Turkey
Expatriate footballers in the United Arab Emirates
2019 Copa América players